MJ Pelser (born ) is a South African rugby union player for the  in United Rugby Championship. His regular position is flanker.

In 2020 Pelser was named in the Lions squad for the Super Rugby Unlocked competition.

References

Alumni of Monument High School
South African rugby union players
Living people
1998 births
Rugby union flankers
Lions (United Rugby Championship) players
Golden Lions players
Zebre Parma players